The 1950 Critérium du Dauphiné Libéré was the 4th edition of the cycle race and was held from 25 June to 2 July 1950. The race started and finished in Grenoble. The race was won by Nello Lauredi of the Helyett team.

General classification

References

1950
1950 in French sport
June 1950 sports events in Europe
July 1950 sports events in Europe